Leonid Ivanovich Volkov (December 9, 1934 – May 17, 1995) was an ice hockey player who played in the Soviet Hockey League.  Born in Gorky, Soviet Union, he played for Torpedo Gorky and HC CSKA Moscow.  He was inducted into the Russian and Soviet Hockey Hall of Fame in 1964.

References

External links
Russian and Soviet Hockey Hall of Fame bio

1934 births
1995 deaths
HC CSKA Moscow players
Sportspeople from Nizhny Novgorod
Torpedo Nizhny Novgorod players
Olympic ice hockey players of the Soviet Union
Ice hockey players at the 1964 Winter Olympics
Olympic gold medalists for the Soviet Union
Olympic medalists in ice hockey
Medalists at the 1964 Winter Olympics
Russian ice hockey players